Sumiyoshi Park (住吉公園 Sumiyoshi Kōen) is an Osaka prefectural park in Hamaguchi-higashi Itchome, Suminoe-ku, Osaka, Japan.

It was registered by Osaka Prefecture in 1873 with Hamadera Park in Nishi-ku, Sakai, and is the oldest park in Osaka.

Access
Nankai Railway Nankai Line: Sumiyoshitaisha Station
Hankai Tramway Uemachi Line: Sumiyoshikoen Station
Hankai Tramway Hankai Line: Sumiyoshi-toriimae Station

References

External links
 Sumiyoshi Park - Osaka Prefectural Park Association
 Sumiyoshi Park

Parks and gardens in Osaka